Simon Lacroix (born August 30, 1984) is a Canadian actor and writer based in Quebec. He is most noted as a three-time Gémeaux Award nominee for his role as Éric in the television comedy series Lâcher prise.

Born in Ottawa, Ontario, he is a 2011 graduate of the Conservatoire d'art dramatique de Montréal. He first became known for Projet bocal, a play he wrote and performed in with Raphaëlle Lalande et Sonia Cordeau in 2013.

He was a Gémeaux nominee for Best Supporting Actor in a Comedy Series in 2017, 2018 and 2019. In 2021, he was a nominee for Best Lead Actor in a Drama Series for his role as Albert Scott Ducharme in Faits divers.

Filmography

Film

Television

Stage roles
 2009: L'Envolée Symphonique
 2010: Le Jumeau de Molière
 2010: Appartement B
 2010: Kroum
 2010: OMFUG
 2011: Le jardin de griottes (La Cerisaie)
 2011: Pinocchio
 2011: Poésie, sandwichs et autres soirs qui penchent
 2013: Projet bocal
 2014: Les Voisins
 2018: Le déclin de l'empire américain
 2020: Fairfly

References

External links

1984 births
Living people
21st-century Canadian male actors
21st-century Canadian male writers
21st-century Canadian dramatists and playwrights
21st-century Canadian screenwriters
Canadian male film actors
Canadian male stage actors
Canadian male television actors
Canadian male television writers
Canadian male dramatists and playwrights
Canadian screenwriters in French
Canadian dramatists and playwrights in French
Franco-Ontarian people
French Quebecers
Male actors from Ottawa
Male actors from Montreal
Writers from Ottawa
Writers from Montreal